Germans in Finland are immigrants from Germany residing in Finland.

History 

During the Middle Ages, the most important officers and other nobles were Swedish or Germans. In Turku and Viipuri 75% of bourgeoisies were German.
Germans were also merchants. By 1924 there were 1,645 Germans in Finland.

German families were essential for the development of Finland and Helsinki in the 1800s. German was the third most spoken language in Helsinki at the time, and German schools which still operate today were established in Helsinki.

During World War II, there were about 200,000 German soldiers in Finland in the period 1941–1944, and an estimated 700 children were born to German soldiers and Finnish women.

Many present-day Finnish companies were started by Germans, like Paulig and Stockmann.

FC Germania Helsinki is a sports club funded by Germans in Finland in 2017.

Finnish people of German descent

 Carl Gustaf Emil Mannerheim, former Finnish president
 Maria Guzenina, politician
 Peter von Bagh, science author 
 Lasse Pöysti, actor
 Carl Ludvig Engel, architect 
 Eva Polttila, former news anchor
 Roman Schatz, writer
 Fredrik Pacius, composer
 Samu Haber, singer-songwriter

See also 

 Finland–Germany relations

References 

Ethnic groups in Finland
Finland–Germany relations
 
Finland